The 1975 LSU Tigers football team represented Louisiana State University (LSU) during the 1975 NCAA Division I football season.  Under head coach Charles McClendon, the Tigers had a record of 5–6 with a Southeastern Conference record of 2–4. It was McClendon's fourteenth season as head coach at LSU.

Schedule

Roster
RB #4Charles Alexander, Fr.

References

LSU
LSU Tigers football seasons
LSU Tigers football